Carina (minor planet designation: 491 Carina) is a minor planet orbiting the Sun.

References

External links
 
 

Background asteroids
Carina
Carina
C-type asteroids (SMASS)
19020903